Branko (1331–65) was a Serbian magnate who served to king and emperor Stefan Dušan (r. 1331–55), and emperor Stefan Uroš V (r. 1355–71), with the titles of sluga and later sevastokrator. A member of an old and respectable family, possibly descending from the Serbian dynasty itself, Branko began his royal service in the nearest circle of the ruler. After the elevation of the Serbian state to the Empire (1346), Branko received the second-highest court title, sevastokrator, usually given to relatives. He governed the Ohrid region (in Macedonia). Branko had three sons and a daughter, of whom Vuk Branković would become an important person in the period of the Fall of the Serbian Empire.

Origin and early life
Branko's father Mladen ( 1319–26) was a great dignitary that served the Serbian kings Stefan Milutin (r. 1282–1321) and Stefan Dečanski (r. 1321–31). He first held the title of župan (count), then after successfully performing civil affairs (as a judge) and excelling in military affairs, he became a vojvoda (general), during the reign of Stefan Dečanski. It is unknown whether Mladen lived to serve King Stefan Dušan, as is the case with many other magnates such as vojvoda Vojin and čelnik Gradislav Vojšić. Branko's paternal uncle Nikola ( 1329) also had the title of župan, most likely serving as a governor of Lezhë (in northern Albania).

The family was old and respectable. In 1365, Branko's sons stressed that their villages in Drenica (in Kosovo) that they granted to the Hilandar monastery, were "the patrimony of our great-grandfathers, grandfathers, parents, and ours until today", which means that they held it at least in the fourth generation. M. Spremić concluded that the family's hereditary land was Drenica and that it doubtlessly hailed from Kosovo. Spremić also stressed the possibility of the family originating from the Nemanjić dynasty itself; Branko's later appearance as sevastokrator, a title usually given to relatives, points to this. Sources from the period when the Branković dynasty ruled the Serbian Despotate, and later, speak of the family as descending from the Nemanjić dynasty. M. Blagojević maintained that Mladen's ancestry could not be reliably determined, but mentioned the fact that he had a namesake in the son of Grand Prince Vukan Nemanjić (r. 1202–04).

Branko is mentioned with the title of sluga, serving Stefan Dušan when he was still a king (1331–45). The sluga (or peharnik) was the equivalent of the "cup-bearer" (domestikos), and thus, the bearer was in the nearest circle of the monarch, expected to have had a strong influence on the ruler.

Serbian Empire
Emperor Dušan, after being crowned in 1346, gave his closest associates the Byzantine titles of despot, sevastokrator, and kesar. Branko's receival of the title was likely due to kinship ties (as was the case with Dejan); the title was usually given to kinfolk. These high title-holders were governors of provinces southwards from Skoplje, in the part of the empire called "the Greek lands". Branko was the lord of Ohrid (in Macedonia). It is unknown when exactly he received the title. Unlike other older contemporaries of his, Branko did not advance further (to despot). In 1347, his sister Ratoslava married župan Altoman Vojinović ( 1333–59), who at first ( 1333) was a lord in the vicinity of Ragusa (Dubrovnik), then as a veliki župan in the beginning of the second half of the 14th century held a province in the valley of Gruža. After Dušan's death (1355), Branko continued to serve under Dušan's son and heir Stefan Uroš V (r. 1355–71). His year of death is unknown, and he is no longer mentioned in sources after 1365.

In March 1365, emperor Uroš V issued a charter to Hilandar (on Mount Athos) at the request of Branko's son starac (elder) Roman, who agreed with his brothers Vuk and Grgur to grant the Church of the Holy Archangel to Hilandar. Spremić believes that he died sometime before March 1365. After his death, in the period of the Fall of the Serbian Empire, his sons retreated north, to Drenica. During the reign of Uroš V, his sons Vuk and Grgur held only their hereditary land in Drenica. Branko's oldest son Radonja was married to Jelena, the sister of Uglješa and Vukašin Mrnjavčević. Vuk started expanding his province after the Battle of Maritsa (1371). His daughter Vojislava (Teodora) married George Thopia, the Lord of Durazzo.

Branko is the eponymous founder of the Branković noble family.

Branko's Belt

One fragment of Branko's belt was in possession of Austrian Iklé family and was part of the Iklé Collection, this fragment including other items from this collection, was sold in auction to The British Museum, in 1989. Item is kept in the archive and it is not on display. The other fragment of the belt is kept in State Hermitage Museum in Saint Petersburg.

On the preserved parts of the gold embroidery called "Branko's Belt" (Brankov pojas), taken to have been ordered by Branko, a helmet with a crest of a rising lion is depicted, along with the name Branko. The lion, as a motive of monarchial iconography in Serbia, appears in coinage of Stefan Dušan and Stefan Uroš V, and in an independent presentation in a seal of the latter. The lion then disappears from the repertoire of Stefan Uroš V, but is maintained by the Branković family, in various forms. S. Novaković found one fragment of the belt in the collection of the Russian archaeological commission.

Psalter
The Bucharest Psalter (also known in Romanian as Psaltirii sârbeşti, "Serbian Psalter") was written for Branko Mladenović in 1346, and is indexed as "MS 205" in the Library of the Romanian Academy of Sciences. It is one of the Slavonic basis for 16th-century Romanian psalters. The illuminated manuscript includes an image of the Temple of Sophia.

Family

Unknown 
Nikola ( 1329), župan
Mladen ( 1319–26), župan and vojvoda.
Branko
Radonja ( 1364–d. 1399), kesar and monk. 
Vuk (1345–1397), gospodar.
Grgur ( 1347–61), kesar.
Vojislava

Annotations

References

Sources

 
 
 
 
 
 
 
 
 
 
 
 
 
 

14th-century Serbian nobility
People of the Serbian Empire
Sebastokrators
People from Ohrid
Branković dynasty
14th-century deaths
Year of birth unknown
Medieval Serbian magnates
Boyars of Stefan Dušan